Nakharar ( naxarar, from Parthian naxvadār "holder of the primacy") was a hereditary title of the highest order given to houses of the ancient and medieval Armenian nobility.

Nakharar system
Medieval Armenia was divided into large estates, which were the property of an enlarged noble family and were ruled by a member of it, to whom the title of nahapet "chief of the family" or tanuter "master of the house" was given. Other members of a nakharar family in their turn ruled over smaller portions of the family estate. Nakharars with greater authority were recognized as ishkhans (princes). 

This system has often been labelled as feudal for practical purposes; however, there are differences between this system and the feudal system later adopted in Western Europe. The estate as a whole was actually ruled by a single person, it was nonetheless considered the property of his whole enlarged family, so that, if the ruler died heirless, he was succeeded by a member of a different branch of the family. Furthermore, the ruler was allowed to alienate a part of the family estate only to another member of the family or by permission of the whole enlarged family. This may also explain why Armenian feudal families were normally endogamic, in order not to scatter parts of their property, as would have happened if they had to give a part of their property to another family as dowry. Endogamic marriages had a religious reason too, particularly before Christianity, because Armenian paganism favoured marriages between relatives very highly. 

Each nakharar had his own army, depending on his domain. The national force or "royal cavalry" was under the sparapet, a  commander-in-chief who presided over the whole of the nation. After the country's Christianization, schools and courts were all run by the Armenian clergy.   

In 4th-century Armenia, as in Parthia, large estates were hereditarily possessed by noble families and actually ruled by one of their members. The whole enlarged family was devoted to the worship of the same ancestors, lived in small fortified villages and spent most part of their time in hunting and in banqueting. Furthermore, each nakharar family had a particular social function: in Armenia a member of the Arshakuni family was chosen as king, who was consequently a sort of primus inter pares; the Mamikonians fielded the sparapet, one of the Bagratunis was the cavalry chief (aspet) and king crowner (tagadir), and so on.

History of the nakharars
The  system appears to have originated near or before the beginning of the Common Era, probably emerging under the Artaxiad dynasty and existing during the entire Arsacid period in Armenia and for centuries after its end.

The nakharars survived the fall of the Arshakuni dynasty and the subsequent placement of the Marzban Governor-Generals by Sassanid king, and allowed a great deal of autonomy for the vassal state, up until the attempted conversion of Armenia to Zoroastrianism by Yazdegerd II, in which Vartan Mamikonian led a rebellion, and through the Battle of Vartanantz convinced the Persians that conversion would come at too high a price, eventually leading to the Nvarsak Treaty.

In western Armenia under Byzantine rule, Justinian's reforms removed the martial role of the nakharars, as well as attempting to annex estates from Armenian nobles. The nakharars, angered at their restriction in power, began a full-scale insurrection that had to be quelled through swift military intervention, eventually sparking war with the Sassanids. 

Though weakened by numerous invasions and the legal reforms of Kings, the nakharar structure remained virtually unchanged for many centuries and was finally eliminated during the Mongol invasions in the thirteenth century. Certain aspects of the nakharar system remained intact in Armenia until the early 20th century, when the noble class was altogether abolished by the Bolsheviks.

References

Bibliography
 
 
 

Armenian noble titles
Armenian titles of Parthian origin
Kingdom of Armenia (antiquity)
Medieval Armenia
Feudalism